Robert Harvey Baldwin (June 9, 1948 – June 28, 2011) was a Major League Baseball outfielder with the 1975 Detroit Tigers and the 1976 New York Mets.

Baldwin was born in Tazewell, Virginia, and attended Southern University and A&M College in Baton Rouge, Louisiana on a scholarships for baseball, football and soccer. He signed with the Detroit Tigers as an undrafted free agent in 1972, and received his first call to the majors in 1975 when a thumb injury ended Tigers outfielder Mickey Stanley's season. He batted .221 with four home runs and eight runs batted in filling in at right field and center field.

He was traded with Mickey Lolich to the New York Mets for Rusty Staub and Bill Laxton on December 12, 1975. He spent the 1976 season with the Mets triple-A affiliate, the Tidewater Tides, and joined the Mets when rosters expanded that September. He batted .292 over nine games with the big league club.

Though he remained in the minors with the Mets through 1978, he would never see Major League action again. In a two-season career, Baldwin batted .231 (27-for-117) and five home runs, driving in 13 runs while scoring 12 times in 39 games. He also collected four doubles, one triple, and two stolen bases.

Baldwin died in Hudson, Ohio, in 2011.

References

External links

1951 births
2011 deaths
African-American baseball players
American expatriate baseball players in Mexico
Baseball players from Virginia
Clinton Pilots players
Columbus Clippers players
Detroit Tigers players
Evansville Triplets players
Lakeland Tigers players
Major League Baseball outfielders
Montgomery Rebels players
New York Mets players
People from Tazewell, Virginia
Plataneros de Tabasco players
Tidewater Tides players
20th-century African-American sportspeople
21st-century African-American people